Euryglottis davidianus is a moth of the  family Sphingidae. It is known from Ecuador and western Peru.

The wingspan is about 80 mm. It is similar to Euryglottis aper but can be distinguished by the paler head paler smaller yellow abdominal spots and straighter subbasal and discal lines on the forewing upperside.

Adults have been recorded in March and April.

References

Euryglottis
Moths described in 1891